In mathematics, complex group may refer to:
An archaic name for the symplectic group
Complex reflection group
A complex  algebraic group
A complex Lie group